Age of Love is the fourth studio album by German band Scooter, released in 1997. Age of Love was released containing two singles, "Fire" and "The Age of Love". It is the last studio album featuring Ferris Bueller, who left the band in 1998 to pursue a solo career. "Fire" appears on the Mortal Kombat: Annihilation Soundtrack. "Fire" received Gold in Germany for selling 250,000 copies.

Track listing

Notes
"The Age of Love" samples the main theme from the soundtrack from the film Terminator 2: Judgment Day and the bell is inspired by the song "Hells Bells" by AC/DC.
"Forever (Keep Me Running)" samples the song "Keep Me Running" by the German dance production team Bass Bumpers.

Charts

Sales and certifications

References

1997 albums
Scooter (band) albums
Edel AG albums